Československé hudební nástroje, oborový podník (Czechoslovak Musical Instruments, specialized business) was — during the era of communist Czechoslovakia from 1948 to 1992 — a state owned music instrument manufacturing company headquartered in Hradec Králové.  The company name was later amended — "Československé hudební nástroje, státní podnik" — to reflect ownership by the government.  In the 1970s, 50% of its musical instrument export products were supplied to the Soviet Union.

Brands and nationalized companies 
The nationalized companies and brands included Petrof, Amati, Červený, Cremona, Rieger-Kloss, Delicia, Jolana, and Tofa.

Publication 
Czechoslovak Musical Instruments published a journal, Hudební nástroje (Musical Instruments) a "journal for research, development, production and use of musical instruments."

Notable people 
 Vladimír Kopta, general manager

Affiliations 
Czechoslovak Musical Instruments was the founding sponsor of the Prague International Jazz Festival and underwrote it until 1970, when the Ministry of Culture took over.

References 

Guitar manufacturing companies
Bowed string instrument makers
Brass instrument manufacturing companies
Piano manufacturing companies
Czech brands
Musical instrument manufacturing companies of the Czech Republic
Manufacturing companies of Czechoslovakia